The Belfast Giants (known officially as the Stena Line Belfast Giants due to sponsorship) are a professional ice hockey team based in Belfast, Northern Ireland. They compete in the UK's Elite Ice Hockey League (EIHL) and are the current champions for the 6th time in their history. They play their home games at the SSE Arena (formerly known as the Odyssey Arena). Since their inception in 2000, the Giants have won fourteen major honours, including six British league championships, two British championships by winning the play-offs, and five Challenge Cups.

History

Background 
The Belfast Giants Ltd. was founded in 1997 by two Canadian businessmen, Bob Zeller and his associate Albert Maasland, after Zeller was in talks with the British Ice Hockey Superleague (BISL) to launch a new franchise in the United Kingdom. The city of Belfast was chosen, with its new £92 million Millennium Commission project, the Odyssey Complex, due to be completed with the addition of a deal brokered between the Odyssey Trust and facility management company SMG to house the new hockey team in the arena. On 22 March 2000, the BISL confirmed that the Belfast Giants had been accepted into the league to begin play in September for the 2000-01 season.

In order to build a competitive roster for the new club, Bob Zeller approached Bracknell Bees championship-winning head coach Dave Whistle to become the first head coach of the Belfast Giants. Initially, Whistle was sceptical, deterred by having seen the violent footage of The Troubles on North American news media. In response, Zeller invited Whistle to visit Belfast and experience the changing city first-hand. Following his visit, Whistle agreed on a 3-year deal to coach the Giants. Whistle's roster recruitment began by looking toward his championship team in Bracknell, signing seven core players from that team to build upon in Belfast: Shane Johnson, Todd Kelman, Rob Stewart, Todd Goodwin, Kevin Riehl, Paxton Schulte, and Colin Ward. The captaincy was awarded to incumbent signing Jeff Hoad, with assistants Jason Bowen and Colin Ward.

Superleague era (2000-03)

Inaugural season 
The beginning of the inaugural Giants season was marred with difficulties as the opening of the Odyssey Arena was delayed until early December 2000. This meant that the Giants were forced to play their first 15 games of the season on the road, without consistent ice-time for training or practice. Regardless, the Giants made their debut on 16 September 2000 against the Nottingham Panthers losing 5–1, with Kory Karlander scoring the club's first ever goal. The next evening, the Giants would travel to Bracknell in an unwelcome return for Whistle and his former Bees core. The Giants came out on top 6-5 after a shoot-out for their first ever win. However, the Giants would win only 4 out of 15 games to start the year.

Finally, the Giants played their first home game against the Ayr Scottish Eagles on 2 December 2000 to a sell-out crowd of 7,300 in what Whistle described as an "awesome spectacle" despite a 2–1 defeat. In the first period, Paxton Schulte would score the only goal for the Giants and fought Trevor Doyle shortly after, cementing his overnight status as a cult player for the hometown fans. The home ice proved to instigate a turn in fortune for the Giants mid-way through the season, playing in front of a consistently sold-out Odyssey Arena. The Giants would finish the season with a respectable 17-16-6-9 record, finishing in 6th place, and progressing into Group A of the playoffs to then be knocked out with a 3–3 record. The Giants saw more success in the Challenge Cup, finishing 1st in the group stage to progress to the two-leg semi-final against the Sheffield Steelers. The Giants won the first leg, 2–1, and lost the second leg, 7–0, for an 8-2 aggregate loss.

Championship 
Dave Whistle re-signed ten members of the original line-up for the Giants second season, adding only six to the new roster; defencemen Chad Allan and Terran Sandwith, forwards Curt Bowen, Dave Matsos and Jason Ruff, and Mike Bales in goal. Jeff Hoad, Jason Bowen, and Colin Ward would retain their roles as captain and assistant captains respectively, to be joined by Sandwith as a third assistant captain. The season began with an exhibition tournament, the BT Ice Cup, hosted by the Giants with invitations to the London Knights, Eisbären Berlin, and the Frankfurt Lions.

In their first league game, the Giants suffered a 9–3 defeat to the London Knights. This would be followed by a succession of sub-par performance on the road. By late September, Whistle decided to bring in centre Sean Berens to bolster the Giants offence. Berens' arrival and subsequent placement on the first line with Riehl and Ruff would prove a catalyst for the Giants' success to come. The Giants would go on a 9-game unbeaten streak shortly thereafter, which was broken by two losses, the first away in London and the second at home to the Nottingham Panthers on 16 October, which would be their last home defeat of the season. The Giants would then win 7–2 at home against Ayr to gain 1st place, where the team would remain for the rest of the season.

Following a 4–1 win at Sheffield on 17 January 2001, the Giants travelled to Bracknell needing only 1 point to win the league. On the 19th January, in a poetic return to Bracknell for Whistle and his former Bees core, the Giants would force a 2–2 draw with the home side to clinch their first ever championship with a league record-breaking 16-game unbeaten streak. Upon their arrival back in Belfast, the Giants were welcomed at Belfast City Airport by over one thousand boisterous fans. Unfortunately the Giants would struggle with a championship hangover as the team botched come playoff time, not making it past the qualification group. The Giants would, however, advance to the Challenge Cup final for the first time in their history, only to be stifled 5-0 by the Scottish Eagles.  That particular match became known amongst fans of the Belfast Giants at that time as 'Black Sunday' A reference to the jersey worn by the team during the match, introduced for the occasion of their inaugural Challenge cup as well as the day it was played on and the heavy defeat by a team that had suffered crushing losses to them during the regular season. Hockey fans who watched that game and also watched the Winter Olympics Men's Ice Hockey final later on/in the early hours of the next day would have seen Theo Fleury, a later Giants signing receive his gold medal as part of the winning team.

Playoff title and Superleague demise 

With the eventual demise of the Superleague in mid-2003, there were concerns that the Giants organisation would not survive because of developing financial issues. The club ran up debts of approximately £1.4 million, with Maasland saying that the Giants were "by far and away the worst business [he had] been involved in". One partner company was believed to be owed nearly £65,000. However, facing the threat of liquidation, creditors voted to accept a 20p-to-the-pound pay-out, allowing the club to continue under new ownership of local businessman Jim Gillespie and join the newly established first-tier of British ice hockey dubbed the Elite Ice Hockey League (EIHL).

Elite League era (2003-present) 

The Belfast Giants have won five EIHL regular season titles - the most recent of which came during the 2021–22 campaign, four Challenge Cup titles (including in 2017–18, 2018–19 and 2021–22), and two play-off championships.

Belfast Giants were added to EA Sports' NHL 20 game, enabling players to take control of the Giants in the Champions Hockey League.

The 2019–20 EIHL season was cancelled on 13 March 2020 with the remaining league fixtures and subsequent play-offs scrapped due to the coronavirus pandemic. The Challenge Cup was the only competition to see a winner crowned.

The 2020–21 Elite League season - originally pencilled in for a revised start date of 5 December - was suspended on 15 September 2020, because of ongoing uncertainty over coronavirus pandemic restrictions. The EIHL board determined that the season was non-viable without supporters being permitted to attend matches and unanimously agreed to a suspension. The season was cancelled completely in February 2021.

In March 2022, the Belfast Giants won their fourth Challenge Cup title after beating the Cardiff Devils 3–2 in overtime at the SSE Arena. The victory made head coach Adam Keefe the most successful in Giants history. The Giants then clinched the 2021–22 Elite League title in April, after a 2-1 shootout victory over the Sheffield Steelers. However they missed out on the treble after losing the 2022 EIHL play-off final 6-3 to the Cardiff Devils.

Team information

Logos and uniforms 
Since 2000 the Giants' main logo has depicted a stylized version of the mythical warrior Finn McCool, who is commonly portrayed as a giant in popular folklore. The original logo had Finn brandishing a hockey stick with the Giants' wordmark in the foreground. The inaugural Giants uniforms featured white home jerseys with red and teal striping, matching socks, and black shorts. The inaugural away jerseys featured their now famous teal with red and white striping, matching socks, and black shorts.

For the 2001–02 season the Giants introduced red jerseys with teal and white striping for the BT Ice Cup, and black jerseys with teal and red striping for the Challenge Cup.

In 2002–03, the Giants altered their home jerseys to feature red shoulder piping with teal and black stripes.

For 2004–05 the Giants replaced the red shoulder piping with black piping on home jerseys and changed away jerseys to mirror these except with teal as the primary colour.

Ahead of the 2021–22 EIHL season, the Giants unveiled a refreshed primary logo and alteration to the club's home, away and Challenge Cup jerseys.

Arena 
One corner of the SSE Arena has been dubbed 'Boomerang Corner' – named in memory of long time Giants fan, Stewart Boone – and was left unreserved for a large group of fans who generate noise, bang drums, and start game night chants until the 2022–23 season when these seats became bookable.

Originally there was a traditional four-sided scoreboard suspended over centre ice. This has recently been replaced by two large screens for scores and video replays; one behind Boomerang Corner and one at the opposite corner of the rink. Two traditional scoreboards are located in the two remaining corners.

Team culture
Sectarianism has long been a significant problem with sports in Northern Ireland. When the club was established, Giants' management was committed to ensure the club did not attach itself to any particular faith or community, instead aspiring to represent Belfast as a whole. A number of policies were introduced to achieve this. Football colours, clothing, and flags which may have displayed a persons' political or religious affiliation were banned from the arena. The national anthem of the United Kingdom, traditionally played before games at other arenas in the Elite League, is not played before Giants games.

These policies have been successful as the Giants have built a large and enthusiastic fanbase which has become known as the 'Teal Army'. As of 16 March 2020, the Giants have averaged an attendance of 4,387, ranking them 3rd amongst UK teams and 80th in Europe.

The Giants have an official podcast, "A View From the Bridge", hosted by fans Patrick Smyth, Davey McGimpsey, Simon Kitchen, and Joel Neill. There is also an official supporters club known as the Giants OSC.

Team songs 
For many years the Giants have been introduced onto the ice with the song "Rise" by English rock band The Cult. The Giants' goal song begins with The Irish Rovers' version of "The Belle of Belfast City", a popular local rendition of the old children's folk song "I'll Tell Me Ma". This is mixed into "Song 2" by English Britpop group Blur before face-off.

Current squad 
Squad for 2022-23 Elite League season 

* Denotes two-way deal with NIHL side Hull Seahawks
** Denotes two-way deal with NIHL side Milton Keynes Lightning

Former Giants

Retired jersey numbers
 4 Shane Johnson
11 Colin Ward
16   Rob Stewart
18 Graeme Walton
19 Colin Shields
27 Paxton Schulte
44 Todd Kelman

Notable former players
 2 Brock Matheson
 5 Will Colbert
 5 Jérôme Gauthier-Leduc — former Buffalo Sabres draft pick, played for Belfast February–June 2017
 9 Andrew Fournier
 12 Kyle Baun —  ex AHLer
 14 Theoren Fleury — former Stanley Cup-winning NHL player
 14 Daymen Rycroft
 14 Mike Forney — 2015–17; former Atlanta Thrashers draft pick
 15 Scott Champagne
 15 Kevin Westgarth — former Stanley Cup-winning NHL player
 15 Darcy Murphy —  2018–19 top EIHL points scorer (79) 
 17 Gregory Stewart
 19 Colin Shields —  EIHL all-time top points scorer and ex-Philadelphia Flyers draft pick
 23 Alex Foster - 2016–17; ex-Toronto Maple Leafs NHLer
 23 Griffin Reinhart - 2021–22; ex-New York Islanders and Edmonton Oilers; 2012 NHL first-round draft pick
 24 Noah Clarke
 24 Jonathan Ferland —  a one-time Montreal Canadiens draft pick
 25 Blair Riley —  2016–19; ex-AHLer who also captained the Giants from 2017 to 2019
 34 Tyler Beskorowany —  a Dallas Stars draft pick in 2008
 39 Patrick Dwyer —  the ex-Carolina Hurricanes NHLer played for Belfast between 2018 and 2019 before retiring
 43 Derrick Walser — former NHL defenceman and Belfast player/coach 2015–17
 50 Matt Nickerson — former NHL draft pick, played for Belfast for two seasons - 2015–17
 83 Dustin Johner —  a Florida Panthers draft pick in 2001
 91 Nathan Robinson

Captains

Head coaches

Franchise scoring leaders
These are the Top 10 Points Scoring Leaders for the Belfast Giants:

Note: GP = Games Played, G = Goals, A = Assists, Pts = Points

Honours

2000–01
ISL Second Team All-Star: Kory Karlander

2001–02
Superleague Champions
ISL First Team All-Star: Mike Bales, Rob Stewart, Kevin Riehl, Sean Berens, Jason Ruff

2002–03
Superleague Playoff Champions
ISL First Team All-Star: Robby Sandrock, Paxton Schulte
ISL Second Team All-Star: Ryan Bach, Kevin Riehl

2003–04
EIHL First Team All-Star: Jason Ruff

2004–05
British Cross-League: 1st Place
EIHL First Team All-Star: Tony Hand
EIHL Second Team All-Star: Martin Klempa and George Awada

2005–06
Elite League Champions
EIHL First Team All-Star: Theo Fleury and Ed Courtenay
EIHL Second Team All-Star: Mike Minard, Todd Kelman and George Awada
Vic Batchelder Memorial Trophy: Nathan Craze

2008–09
EIHL Challenge Cup Champions
EIHL Knock Out Cup Champions
EIHL First Team All-Star: Paul Deniset

2009–10
EIHL Play-off Champions
EIHL First Team All-Star: Stephen Murphy and Colin Shields
EIHL Second Team All-Star: Michael Jacobsen and Jeff Szwez

2010–11
EIHL First Team All-Star: Jon Gleed
EIHL Second Team All-Star: Stephen Murphy

2011–12
Elite League Champions
EIHL First Team All-Star: Stephen Murphy and Jeff Mason
EIHL Second Team All-Star: Jeremy Rebek and Robert Dowd

2012–13
Erhardt Conference Winners
EIHL Second Team All-Star: Robbie Sandrock

2013–14
Elite League Champions
Erhardt Conference Winners
EIHL First Team All-Star: Rob Sandrock, Calvin Elfring and Kevin Saurette
EIHL Second Team All-Star: Stephen Murphy, Jeff Szwez and Evan Cheverie

2015–16
EIHL Second Team All-Star: Derrick Walser, James Desmarais

2016–17
EIHL First Team All-Star: Jim Vandermeer
EIHL Second Team All-Star: Derrick Walser, Blair Riley

2017–18
EIHL Challenge Cup Champions
EIHL First Team All-Star: Sébastien Sylvestre

2018–19
Elite League Champions
EIHL Challenge Cup Champions
Erhardt Conference Winners
EIHL First Team All-Star: Tyler Beskorowany, Josh Roach, Darcy Murphy
EIHL Second Team All-Star: Kyle Baun, Patrick Dwyer

2021–22
EIHL Challenge Cup Champions
Elite League Champions
EIHL First Team All-Star: Tyler Beskorowany, Griffin Reinhart, J.J. Piccinich, Scott Conway

References

External links
 
 Kingdom of the Giants (News and forum site run by fans)

 
Ice hockey teams in the United Kingdom
Sports teams in Northern Ireland
Ice hockey in Northern Ireland
Sports clubs in Belfast
Ice hockey clubs established in 2000
2000 establishments in Northern Ireland
Elite Ice Hockey League teams